Joseph Chan Yuek-sut, BBS (born 29 March 1936) is the former chairman and member of the Southern District Council and member of the Urban Council of Hong Kong.

Born on 29 March 1936, Chan studied at the Grantham College of Education, Shue Yan College, Wah Kiu College, Chinese University of Hong Kong and the Chu Hai College. He was a member of the standing committee of the Hong Kong Civic Association and was first elected to the Urban Council of Hong Kong in the reformed election in 1983, in which he served until the council was abolished in 1999. He was also the principal of the Aberdeen Saint Peter's Catholic Primary School. He had served in Shek Pai Wan for many years, and was member of the Southern District Board representing the area from 1982 to 2003. For his contributions, he was awarded Bronze Bauhinia Star (BBS) in 2003.

References

District councillors of Southern District
Members of the Urban Council of Hong Kong
Hong Kong Civic Association politicians
Liberal Democratic Federation of Hong Kong politicians
Hong Kong educators
Alumni of the Chinese University of Hong Kong
1936 births
Living people
Recipients of the Bronze Bauhinia Star
Hong Kong Roman Catholics